Mariano Barroso (born 26 December 1959) is a Spanish film director and screenwriter. He has directed more than 20 films since 1982. His 1996 film Éxtasis was entered into the 46th Berlin International Film Festival.

Since 9 June 2018, he is the President of the Spanish Academy of Cinematographic Arts and Sciences.

Selected filmography
 1996: Éxtasis (Extasis)
 1999: Los lobos de Washington
 2001: In the Time of the Butterflies
 2006: 
 2011: Lo mejor de Eva (Dark Impulse)
 2013: Todas las mujeres (All the Women)

References

External links

1959 births
Living people
Spanish film directors
Spanish male screenwriters
People from Barcelona
21st-century Spanish screenwriters